Janelle Patton was a 29-year-old Sydney woman who was murdered on Norfolk Island on 31 March 2002. The case made national headlines in Australia and New Zealand, as she was the first person to be murdered on Norfolk Island since 1893.

Background
Patton went to Norfolk Island seeking a new beginning following a number of failed relationships in her homeland of Australia. However, it was said by her family that she experienced several further unhappy relationships whilst living on the island. Her parents arrived from Australia for a visit on the day before her murder. Patton was last seen going on her morning walk along a coastal track near her home. Her parents became concerned when she failed to appear for a lunch appointment and contacted the police. Soon after, a body matching their daughter's description was discovered by two tourists from New Zealand. The body was found at the Cockpit Waterfall Reserve at the opposite end of the island from where she was last seen, wrapped in a large black plastic sheet. The body was formally identified by Patton's landlady. Janelle Patton had 64 stab wounds, a fractured skull, broken pelvis and broken ankle. She had died from a stab wound to the chest that punctured her lung.

Arrest
The investigation into Patton's murder was protracted and difficult, although the main forensics were Patton's defensive wounds, the black sheet she was wrapped in, and pieces of green glass in her hair. Eventually, on 1 February 2006, Glenn Peter Charles McNeill, a 28-year-old chef from New Zealand, was arrested for her murder near the city of Nelson, on the South Island of New Zealand, after being identified by an Australian Federal Police investigation. He was subsequently extradited to Norfolk Island and formally charged with the crime. At the Norfolk Island Court of Petty Sessions McNeill claimed he had smoked marijuana that day and that he had accidentally run over Patton with his car, a statement he later retracted. He was transferred to Silverwater Correctional Centre in Sydney.

Trial
On 1 February 2007, McNeill formally went on trial for the murder. A press blackout was imposed by the judge, Chief Justice Mark Weinberg, to prevent any dilution of the limited potential jury pool in Norfolk Island. On 1 March 2007, McNeill told the Supreme Court, "I did not kill Janelle Patton", "I did not abduct her" and "I did not see Janelle Patton that day". He said he could not recall what he had told police earlier, but "would have admitted to anything" due to his mental health problems. The trial ended on 9 March 2007 when the 11-person jury returned a guilty verdict, although the question of motive and an explanation for unidentified female DNA found on the body remained unclear. On 25 July 2007, McNeill was sentenced to 24 years in prison by Chief Justice Weinberg in the Supreme Court of Norfolk Island sitting in Sydney.

Appeals
McNeill, appealed against his conviction to a Full Court of the Federal Court on grounds that included that his statement to Police should not have been admitted into evidence against him. The Full Court, Chief Justice Black, and Justices Lander and Besanko, dismissed his appeal. The High Court of Australia refused special leave to appeal on 14 November 2008.

Media
The case was covered by Bella Fiori - The Murder of Janelle Patton on 27 July 2021
The case was covered by Casefile True Crime Podcast on 3 December 2016.
The case was covered by Crime Investigation Australia on 28 April 2009.

References

External links 
 Casefile True Crime Podcast - Case 39: Janelle Patton - 3 December 2016

Australian murder victims
Year of birth missing
2002 deaths
People from Sydney
People murdered in Norfolk Island
2002 in Norfolk Island